Villablanca is a town and municipality located in the province of Huelva, Spain. According to the 2011 census, the municipality had a population of 2916 inhabitants. The Constitution Square was designed in the 16th century and is located in the towns centre.

History 
While the name Villalba can be traced to the 16th century, the areas first inhabitants of the have migrated from Africa and became a sedentary people in the neolithic era. 

Parts of the megalithic site La Torre-La Janera are located within the municipality.

Religion 
At the Constitution Square is the San Sebastián Church, built in the 17th century by the Marquis de Ayamonte.

References

Municipalities in the Province of Huelva